The Mercyhurst Lakers represented Mercyhurst University in CHA women's ice hockey during the 2019-20 NCAA Division I women's ice hockey season. The Lakers were undefeated on home ice. Mercyhurst won the College Hockey America Tournament with a 2–1 overtime win over regular season champions, Robert Morris. The overtime victory came at 4:19 with a goal from Summer-Rae Dobson. As tournament champions, Mercyhurst earned a berth in the NCAA Tournament to determine the national championship. On March 12, 2020, the NCAA Tournament was cancelled due to the COVID-19 pandemic.

Offseason
Emma Nuutinen was part of the Team Finland IIHF World Championship Team that earned silver medals.

Recruiting

Standings

Roster

2019–20 Lakers

Schedule

|-
!colspan=12 style=""| Regular Season

|-
!colspan=12 style="background:#0a2351; "| CHA Tournament
 

|-
!colspan=12 style="background:#0a2351; "| NCAA Tournament

Awards and honors

Forward Emma Nuutinen was named the College Hockey America Player of the year. Nuutinen, an olympic bronze medalist with Finland, scored 16 goals and 30 points in her senior year.

Fellow senior forward Michele Robillard joined Nuutinen on the CHA All-Conference First Team. Maggie Knott and Sam Isbell were named to the Second All-Conference Team.

Mike Sisti was named Coach of the Year, and Alexa Vasko was named Defensive Forward of the year.

Following the CHA Tournament, Kennedy Blair won the Tournament MVP, while Summer-Rae Dobson and Jordan Mortlock joined her in the All-Tournament team.

References

Mercyhurst
Mercyhurst Lakers women's ice hockey seasons
Mercy
Mercy